First Congregational Church (First United Church of Christ, Congregational) is a historic church at 802 Prairie Street in Marblehead, Ohio.

It was built in 1900 and added to the National Register of Historic Places in 2000.

References

United Church of Christ churches in Ohio
Churches on the National Register of Historic Places in Ohio
Romanesque Revival church buildings in Ohio
Churches completed in 1900
Buildings and structures in Ottawa County, Ohio
National Register of Historic Places in Ottawa County, Ohio